Looking for an Echo is  2000 independent drama film.

Plot
The lead singer of an oldies group reminisces about the good ol' days and a potential comeback.

Cast
 Armand Assante as Vinnie Pirelli
Rick Faugno as Young Vinnie Pirelli
 Diane Venora as Joanne Delgado
 Tom Mason as Augustus "Augie" MacAnnally III
Tommy J. Michaels as Young Augustus "Augie" MacAnnally III
 Anthony John Denison as Ray "Nappy" Napolitano (as Tony Denison)
Eric Meyersfield as Young Ray "Nappy" Napolitano
 Johnny Williams as Phil "Pooch" Puccirelli
Danny Gerard as Young Phil "Pooch" Puccirelli
 Joe Grifasi as Vic (uncredited)
Johnny Giacalone as Young Vic
 Edoardo Ballerini as Anthony Pirelli
 Christy Carlson Romano as Tina Pirelli
 David Vadim as Tommie Pirelli
 Monica Trombetta as Francine Pirelli
 David Margulies as Dr. Ludwig
 Paz de la Huerta as Nicole Delgado (as Paz De La Huerta)
 Ilana Levine as Sandi (Vic's Date)
 Gena Scriva as Arlene (Blonde at Bar)
 Gayle Scott as Renee (Brunette at Bar)
 Cleveland Still as Singer on Bus
 Peter Jacobson as Marty Pearlstein (Backstage Agent)
 Murray Weinstock as Orchid Blue Lead / Vocals for 'The Dreamers'
 Amanda Homi as Orchid Blue Singer
 Machan Notarile as Orchid Blue Singer (as Machun)
 Michael Cooke Kendrick as Jason (Bar Mitzvah Boy) (as Michael Cooke)
 Kresimir Novakovic as Waiter At Bar
 Uri "Teddy" Dallal as Public Access Drums
 Jorge Pequero as Public Access Bass
 Eva Giangi as Public Access Keyboard
 Lisa France as Night Nurse
 Fanni Green as Day Nurse
 Alesandra Asante as Neighborhood Girl
 Kenny Vance as Vocals for Vince (voice)
 Norbert Leo Butz as Vocals for Anthony (voice) (as Norbert Butz)
 Eddie Hokenson as Vocals for 'The Dreamers' (voice)
 Vinny DeGennaro as Vinny (uncredited)
 Dolores Sirianni as Garyn (uncredited)

External links

2000 films
2000 drama films
American drama films
Films about music and musicians
Films directed by Martin Davidson
Films shot in Atlantic City, New Jersey
Films shot in New York City
2000s English-language films
2000s American films